Addleton is a surname. Notable people with the surname include:

 David Addleton, English rugby union coach
 Jonathan Addleton, American diplomat

References